This is a list of results for the electoral district of Murdoch in Western Australian state elections for the district's two periods of existence from 1977 to 1989 and from 1996 to 2008.

Members for Murdoch

Election results

Elections in the 2000s

Elections in the 1990s

Elections in the 1980s

Elections in the 1970s

References

 
 State Electoral Office (Western Australia). Legislative Assembly : statistics relating to the general elections. Government Printer, various years (1917–1983).

Western Australian state electoral results by district